Achaicus ("belonging to Achaia") was a Corinthian Christian who according to the Bible, together with Fortunatus and Stephanas, carried a letter from the Corinthians to St. Paul, and from St. Paul to the Corinthians (1 Corinthians 16:17; cf. also 16:15).

Life
By Eastern Orthodox Church tradition, Achaicus is also often numbered as one of the Seventy disciples, a group of early followers sent out by Jesus in Luke's gospel. The Biblical account does not mention the names of the seventy disciples, but various lists including Achaicus have been compiled since the 7th century, such as in the Orthodox Study Bible. It's not known whether the three Corinthians walked to Ephesus, a distance of about 900 miles, or crossed the Aegean Sea by ship in two weeks or more. We don't know whether the trip to Ephesus "was a specially commissioned assignment or a regular part of other responsibilities that brought them to the area anyway". But we know for sure they reliably carried two letters and linked a pastor to his people.

Veneration
Achaicus is venerated as saint by Eastern Orthodox Church, Roman Catholic Church and other Christian Churches. In the Orthodox Church, he is commemorated with a feast day on June 15, with his companion Fortunatas. He is also remembered on the Synaxis of the Seventy Apostles on January 4.

References

People in the Pauline epistles
1st-century Greek people
Seventy disciples
Saints of Roman Corinth
First Epistle to the Corinthians
People from Corinth